Millspaugh was an unincorporated community in Inyo County, California. It lies at an elevation of 6,174 feet (1,882 m). It is built on the site of an abandoned community of the same name.

A post office operated at Millspaugh from 1902 to 1910. The town is named for its first postmaster, Almon N. Millspaugh.

References

Unincorporated communities in California
Unincorporated communities in Inyo County, California